The Kalaimamani is the highest civilian award in the state of Tamil Nadu, India. These awards are given by the Tamil Nadu Iyal Isai Nataka Mandram (literature, music and theatre), a unit of the Directorate of Art and Culture, Government of Tamil Nadu, to recognise artists in the state for their achievements.

The Tamil Nadu government has appointed dancer Chitra Visweswaran as the secretary of Tamil Nadu Iyal Isai Nataka Manram. Film music director Deva is its chairman.

Awardees by year

1958
Film Personalities: Padmini

1962
Film Personalities: Sivaji Ganesan

1968
Film Personalities: K. A. Thangavelu
Music: Sangeetha Kalanidhi Late K.S.Narayanaswamy (Vainika)

1969
Film Personalities: Sowcar Janaki

1970 
Music: M. S. Viswanathan (Composer)

1971
Music: Madras A. Kannan, classical music (mridangam)
Music: G.N. Dhandapani Iyer, classical music (veena)

1972
Film Personalities: J. Jayalalithaa

Music: P. K Subbaiyar

1977
Film Personalities: Srividya

1979
Film Personalities: Vyjayanthimala
Music:Manna Dey

1980
Film Personalities: Kamal Haasan, Sripriya
Music: Thanjavur R. Ramamoorthy (Mirudhangam)

1981 
Music: Madurai N. Krishnan, S. P. Balasubrahmanyam

1983
Film Personalities: P. Bhanumathi

1984
Film Personalities: Rajinikanth
Theater: Sabhapati Srinivas

1986

Music: K. J. Yesudas, S. Janaki

1991
Film Personalities: Sukumari

Music : P Leela

1993
Film Personalities: Revathi
Music:Prof.V V Subramanyam

1994
In the 1994, 51 artistes were given Kalaimamani awards.

Film Personalities: R. Sarathkumar, Sukanya, S. Ve. Shekher (stage artiste), Kathadi Ramamurthy (stage artiste), Delhi Ganesh (character actor), T. P. Samikannu (stage comedian), R. V. Udayakumar
Music: D. K. Pattammal (Carnatic lyricist), Sudha Ragunathan (Carnatic vocalist), Swarnalatha (playback singer)
Other: L. S. Ramamirtham (Tamil literature), Malavika Charukkai (Bharatanatyam), P. Ganammal (harmonium), T. G. Subramaniam (thavil), Sundararaj naidu (karagam artiste)

1995
Music: A. R. Rahman

1997
Music:  P. Jayachandran
KS Chithra
Urvashi (actress)

1998
Film Personalities: Palani Bharathi, Prashanth Thiagarajan, Meena, Vijay, Napoleon, Thangar Bachan, Palani Bharathi
Music: Thavil vidwan Idumbavanam K.S. Kannan (Musician)
Bharatnatyam: Priyadarshini Govind

1999
Bharatanatyam: Parvathi Ravi Ghantasala (Artist)
Film Writer: Piraisudan (Writer)

2000
Music: Nithyasree Mahadevan, Swarnalatha, Girija Ramaswamy (devotional singing for dance).
Acting: Ajith Kumar, Devayani

2001
Literature: M.R. Gurusamy (Vriddachalam)

Music: Shashank Subramanyam, Vairamangalam Lakshmi Naryanan, Chennai; Manakkal S. Rangarajan, Chennai; M.A.Sundareswaran (violin), Madurai T.Srinivasan (mridangam), T.M.Krishnamurthy (mridangam), R.Kalyanaraman (ghatam), Rajalakshmi Narayanan (veena), Seetha Duraiswamy (jalatarangam), Adyar S.Jayaraman (nadhaswaram), Thirunageswaram T.R.Govindarajan (thavil), Valayapatti S.Malarvannan (thavil), P.V.N.Nadhamani (clarinet), K.Somu (devotional songs), Karandhai G.Damodaran (devotional songs), Rathinasabapathy Desikar (thevaram).

Bharatanatyam: Udipi Lakshmi Narayanan, M.V.Narasimhachari and Vasanthalakshmi Narasimhachari, Nellai D.Kannan, T.K.Padmanabhan, C.R.Radha Badhri.

Drama: Radhu S.Radhakrishnan, T.K.S.Karuppaiah, 'Periyar' Rajavelu, V.Brinda.

Cinema: Vijayakanth, Murali, Rekha, Gundu Kalyanam, T.K.Pugazhendi, A. P. Komala.

Folk Arts: A. Gunavathi (karagam), V. Dakshinamurthy (street play).

Artistes receiving cash assistance: A. P. Srinivasan (musical-dance), G. Paramasiva Rao (folk), V. K. R. Ramani (drama).

2002
Literature: L.P.Karu Ramanathan Chettiar; Ponnadiyan

Music: T.S.Narayanasamy (vocal), Meera Sivaramakrishnan (violin), Ramani (veena), Vaikkom R.Gopalakrishnan (ghatam), S.Venkataraman (flute), T.S.Vasudeva Rao (tabla), A.C.Jayaraman (nadhaswaram), S.Kasim (nadhaswaram), Vazhuvur R.Manickavinayakam (light music), Kovai Natarajan (harmonium), Dr.S.Sunder (music research).

Bharatanatyam: Krishnaveni Lakshmanan, Ananda Shankar Jayant, C.V.Chandrasekhar; Mannargudi N.Sakthivadivel, C.P.Venkatesan, Yogam Santhanam, Melattur S.Kumar.

Drama: K.G. `Typist' Gopu, Kovai Anuradha, K.S.Krishnan and Koothapiran.

Cinema: Vijayashanti, Vinu Chakravarthy, Goundamani, Senthil, S.M.S.Vasanth.

Folk Arts: Sarangapani (karagam), P.A.Subbulakshmi Palaamadai (villupattu).

Artistes receiving cash assistance: V.S.Azhagesan (musical play), T.P.Chellappa (musical play) and S.Leelavathi (drama).

2003
Music: Sulochana Pattabhiraman (vocal), Nagai R.Muralidharan (violin), S.Ravindaran (veena), Mannargudi A.Eswaran (mridangam), R.Raman (morsing), H.Ramakrishnan (konnakkole), Mannargudi M.S.K.Sankaranarayanan (nadhaswaram), Denkanikotta Mani (thavil), Purisai Arunagiri (devotional music).

Bharatanatyam: Thanjavur Rajalakshmi; G.Lakshmi Rajam; K.S.R.Aniruddha; Ramya Ramanarayan.

Drama: Nanjil P.T.Sami, K.R.Rathinam.

Cinema: Prakash Raj, Simran, Kanaka, Vivek, L.Vaidyanathan, Gajapathy.

Musical dance: S.Soundappan

Folk Arts: Thenmozhi Rajendran (karagam), S.Sivasankaran Pillai (Oyilattam).

Other arts: `Rocket' Ramanathan (mimicry), S.Parthasarathi (for spreading art and culture).

Artistes receiving cash assistance: S.P.Anthonysamy (kaliayalattam), A.S.Balasubramaniam (puppetry) and Pavalar Om Muthumari (street play)

The Tamil Isai Sangam, Madurai, will receive the shield for the best cultural forum and the Cauvery Annai Kalai Mandram, Thanjavur, for the best drama troupe.

The portraits of the following late artistes of yesteryear to be unveiled: `Sivaji' Ganesan, T.V.Narayanasamy (drama artiste), M.P.N.Sethuraman (nadhaswaram), C.S.Murugabhoopathy (mridangam), K.V.Mahadevan (music composer), S.V.Venkataraman (music composer), P.S.Veerappa (film actor), Mani Krishnaswamy (vocalist), A.S.Gnanasambandan (litterateur), Kothamangalam Seenu (musical drama), K.T.Santhanam (lyricist), Pandari Bai (actress), Varadaiah (veena), C.T.Rajagandham (actress), D.R.Ramanna (film producer), Devika (actress), S.V.Ranga Rao (actor), J.P.Chandra Babu (actor).

2004
Iyal (Literature): 4 artists and Tamil scholars
Musicians: 26
Bharatanatyam exponents: 10
Stage artists: 4, including Crazy Mohan
Film Personalities: 10, including Vikram, Sneha, C. R. Saraswathi and P. Vasu
Singers: 5 Ballad and 4 singers
Mohiniyattam: Gopika Varma. She is the first Mohiniyattam dancer to receive this award.

2005

Tamil Film Historian Vamanan, Bharatanatyam exponent Leela Samson, stage artist Bombay Gnanam, film personalities Suriya, Jyothika, Vadivelu, Eyal - G. Gnanasambandam, Silambarasan, Hariharan and Anuradha Sriram.

2006
This year there were a few film personalities awarded with Kalaimamani and out of those were Jayam Ravi, Navya Nair, Trisha, Vishal, Silambarasan and Jiiva.

2009
Artists who won Kalamamani is listed below
Actor: Ajith Kumar, Vineeth, Vadivukkarasi
Actress: Asin Thottumkal, Nayanthara, Meera Jasmine, B. Saroja Devi
Art Director: P. Krishnamurthy
Dancer: Aishwarya Dhanush, Sangeetha Kapilan
Director: Cheran, Sundar C
Musician: Embar Kannan, Harris Jayaraj, Maharajapuram Srinivasan, Sivamani, Thavil Kalaingar Thalachangadu T. M. Ramanathan
Writer: A. Madhavan
Serial Artist: Devipriya
Artist: N.Srinivasan
Best Serial : Metti Oli

2010
The winners are listed below

In the 2010, 26 artistes were given Kalaimamani awards. They include actors Anushka Shetty, Mrs.Sujatha Peer Mohamed (Barathanatiyam Dancer), Tamannaah and Arya, Carnatic vocalist Gayathri Girish, Carnatic Vocalist K.N. Shashikiran, Nathaswara Vidhvan Thirukkadaiyur T.S.Muralitharan, Veena players Rajhesh Vaidhya and S. Srinivasan, dramatist Prasanna Ramaswamy, spiritual orators Desa Mangaiyarkkarasi and S Sathyaseelan, and Tamil scholar Tamizhannal and Dindigul I. Leoni, Flautist Tiruvarur S. Swaminathan, Singer  Kalyani Menon.

2011 
Film Personalities:  R Rajasekar, P. Rajiv alias P Rajasekar, Kutti Padmini, P.R. Varalakshmi, P Pandu, Choreographer Puliyur Saroja

Playback Singer: B.S Sasirekha

Costume Designer: P Kasi

Bharatanatyam Dancer: Shobana

2012 
Actors: S S Senbagamuthu, Rajasree, P. R. Varalakshmi

Playback Singer: Gana Ulaganathan

Director: Chitra Lakshmanan

Cinematographer: Babu alias N V Anandakrishnan

Bharatanatyam dancer : Bala Devi Chandrashekar

2013 
Actors: Prasanna, Nalini, R Pandiyarajan, Kanchana, Sharada, T P Gajendran, stunt master Judo K K Rathnam

Playback singer: R Krishnaraj, Paravai Muniyamma, T Velmurugan

2014 
Actors: Ponvannan

Director: Suresh Krishna

Playback singer: Malathi

Choreographer: NA Thara

Nadhaswaram 
Tiruvannamalai
K.S.Senthil Murugan

Nadhaswaram
Tiruvannamalai
S.Shanthi Senthil Murugan

2015 
Film Personalities: Madhu Balaji, Prabhu Deva

Director: A N Pavithran

Music director: Vijay Antony

Lyricist: Yugabharathi, cinematographer R Rathinavelu

Playback singer: Gana Bala

2016 
Actors: M. Sasikumar, M. S. Bhaskar, Thambi Ramaiah, Soori, Srilekha Rajendran

2017 
Actors: Vijay Sethupathi, Priyamani, Singamuthu

Director: Harish

Music director: Yuvan Shankar Raja

Producer: Kalaignanam

Folk Dancer: T.Thavamani (Karagattam)

Photography: Seshadri Nathan Sugumaran, Ravi

2018Kalaimamani Awards (http://cms.tn.gov.in/sites/default/files/go/tour_t_31_2019.pdf) 
Film Personalities: Srikanth, Santhanam

Producer: A. M. Rathnam

Cinematographer: Ravi Varman

Playback singer: Unni Menon

Keyboard: K. Sathyanarayana

Music: S. J. Jananiy (Multifaceted Musician)

2019 and 2020  
Actors: Sivakarthikeyan, Yogi Babu, Sangeetha Krish, Aishwarya Rajesh, Jangiri Madhumitha, Devadarshini, Nandhakumar, Shanthi Williams, Nithya

Directors: Gautham Vasudev Menon, Manoj Kumar, Liaquat Ali Khan, Ravi Mariya

Producers: Ishari K. Ganesh and Kalaipuli S. Thanu

Music Directors: D. Imman, Dhina

Dialogue Writer: V. Prabhakar

Camera Man: Ragunaatha Reddy

Editor: Anthony

Choreographers: Master Sivasankar, Master Sridhar

Stunt Directors: Thalapathy Dinesh and Jaguar Thangam

Hindustani Music Artists: Shehnai Artists Pandit  S. Ballesh and Krishna Ballesh (Joint Award) 

Lyricists: Kamakodiyan and Kahalmadhi

Playback Singers: Sujatha and Ananthu

Pianist : Anil Srinivasan

Dr. J. Jayalalithaa Special Kalaimamani Award: P.Susheela

Carnatic Music: Ranjani Gayatri, Krishnakumar and Binni Krishnakumar

Bharatanatayam Dance Guru or Teacher: Madurai R. Muralidaran

Costumer: Rajendran

Makeup Men: Shanmugam and Sabarigirisan

Still Photographer: Sitrarasu

Journalist: Sabitha Joseph

Pro: Singaaravelu

List of recipients of 2020

References

External links
 

.
Indian art awards
Indian literary awards
Indian music awards
Indian theatre awards
Tamil film awards
Tamil Nadu awards
Tamil culture
Kalaimamani Award
Kalaimamani Award
Awards established in 1954
1954 establishments in Madras State